The Mecca Hills are a low mountain range located in Riverside County, southern California, in the United States.

The Mecca Hills are in the Colorado Desert section of the Sonoran Desert, adjacent to the Lower Colorado River Valley region. The range lies in an east-west direction, east of the Coachella Valley, west of the Chuckwalla Mountains, and south of Interstate 10. The Mecca Hills are north of the Salton Sea and south of Joshua Tree National Park, with the Orocopia Mountains to the southeast.

Wilderness
Established in 1994 by the U.S. Congress, the U.S. Bureau of Land Management manages the 26,356 acre Mecca Hills Wilderness. The designated wilderness area includes narrow steep-walled canyons that create a natural maze within the badlands. Uniquely faulted and folded geologic formations are the result of activity on the local sections of the San Andreas Fault, making the Mecca Hills one of the more unusual geological sites of this kind.

References

External links
Mecca Hills Wilderness - BLM
Mecca Hills Painted Canyon Ladder Canyon Hike. Hiking in Palm Springs.

Mountain ranges of the Colorado Desert
Mountain ranges of Riverside County, California
Bureau of Land Management areas in California
Coachella Valley
Hills of California
Mountain ranges of Southern California
Protected areas of the Colorado Desert
Protected areas of Riverside County, California
Wilderness areas of California